Der singende Tor (literal English translation: The Singing Fool) is a 1939 German-Italian musical film directed by Johannes Meyer and starring Beniamino Gigli, Kirsten Heiberg, and Hilde Körber. It was a co-production made at Cinecittà Studios in Rome with a German director and a cast of mixed nationalities. The film's sets were designed by the art director Otto Guelstorff. A separate Italian version called Casa lontana was also made.

Cast
 Beniamino Gigli as Carlo Franchetti 
 Kirsten Heiberg as Sylvia Franchetti 
 Hilde Körber as Peggy Kennedy 
 Hans Olden as James Kennedy 
 Elsa Wagner as Diana 
 Werner Fuetterer as Antonio 
 Walter Steinbeck as Franchettis Manager 
 Rudolf Platte as Sekretär 
 Friedrich Kayßler as Judge
 Franz Schafheitlin as Prosecutor
 Ernst Fritz Fürbringer as Defense lawyer
 Rudolf Essek as Korrepetitor Franchettis 
 Else Boy as Freundin Sylvias 
 Oretta Fiume as Freundin Sylvias 
 Charlotte Schellhorn as Bartoli - Witness
 Angelo Ferrari as Direktor der Oper in Neapel

References

Bibliography
 Parish, Robert. Film Actors Guide. Scarecrow Press, 1977.

External links

1939 films
Italian musical films
German musical films
1930s German-language films
Films directed by Johannes Meyer
Films set in Italy
Films of Nazi Germany
German multilingual films
Films shot at Cinecittà Studios
Tobis Film films

German black-and-white films
Italian black-and-white films
1939 multilingual films
1930s Italian films
1930s German films